Brady Oliveira (born August 15, 1997) is a Canadian football running back for the Winnipeg Blue Bombers of the Canadian Football League (CFL). After finishing his career among the University of North Dakota's all-time leading rushers, he was drafted with the 14th overall pick in the 2019 CFL Draft, making him the first overall running back selected.

Early years
As a senior at Oak Park High School, Oliveira was named  Winnipeg High School Football League (WHSFL) Potter Division Offensive Player of the Year after rushing 170 times for 2,220 yards and 34 touchdowns, and catching 6 passes for 142 yards and 2 additional TDs.  In his 370-yard game against Sturgeon, he broke the WHSFL record for single-game touchdowns with 6.

He was named 2012 WHSFL Rookie of the Year as a sophomore in 2012.

Oliveira spent the 2013 season at the Canada Prep Academy in Ontario.

College career
Oliveira finished his career at UND as the program's 7th all-time leading rusher with 2,822 yards (5.6 yards per carry average).

He earned All-Big-Sky Conference honors in 2016 and 2017. UND competed as an FCS independent school in 2018 with no All-Conference teams applicable.  He was named to the 2016 Hero Sports Sophomore All-American team after posting 897 yards and 10 touchdowns.

Oliveira was among 169 nominees for the Allstate Good Works Team recognizing "distinguished accomplishments off the field."

He was invited to and participated in the 2019 College Gridiron Showcase college football all-star event in Fort Worth, Texas.

Oliveira was named one of 5 finalists for the second annual Jon Cornish Trophy given to the most outstanding Canadian player in collegiate football.

Career Stats

Oliveira was named the Red Jarrett Male Athlete of the Year at the 2019 UND Night of Champions as the school's top male athlete.

Professional career
Oliveira went undrafted in the 2019 NFL Draft but was selected 14th overall in the 2019 CFL Draft by the Winnipeg Blue Bombers. On May 13, 2019, it was announced that he had signed his first professional contract with the Blue Bombers. Oliveira injured his ankle during a Week 3 game against the Edmonton Eskimos while working on the kick return team which required surgery, and as a result he missed the rest of the 2019 CFL season. The Blue Bombers went on to win the Grey Cup.
Oliveira returned from injury the following season. He won his second Grey Cup ring.

Career statistics

Personal
Oliveira's father Adail, was a soccer player in Brazil and kickboxer in Canada. His brother Kyle is a mixed martial artist and boxer.

For his 2018 Spring Break, Oliveira went on a mission trip to San Miguel, El Salvador with FOCUS, a trip which he attributes to strengthening his faith in Christ and interest in missionary work and service.
When UND played Sam Houston State for the Potato Bowl, he went to the game and visited some of the local high school kids from around the area.

Over the last few years, Oliveira has been featured on multiple episodes of the YouTube channel The Dodo for his contribution of rescuing and fostering animals.

References

External links 
 Blue Bombers bio
 North Dakota Fighting Hawks Profile

1997 births
Living people
American football running backs
Canadian players of American football
Canadian football people from Winnipeg
North Dakota Fighting Hawks football players
Winnipeg Blue Bombers players